The Last Rebel is the seventh studio album by American rock band Lynyrd Skynyrd, released in 1993. It is the last album to feature drummer Kurt Custer and guitarist Randall Hall.

Track listing
 "Good Lovin's Hard to Find" (Ed King, Gary Rossington, Johnny Van Zant, Robert White Johnson) – 3:55
 "One Thing" (Kurt Custer, King, Dale Krantz-Rossington, Rossington, J. Van Zant) – 5.13
 "Can't Take That Away" (Michael Lunn, J. Van Zant, Robert White Johnson) – 4:19
 "Best Things in Life" (Tom Keifer, Rossington, J. Van Zant) – 3:54
 "The Last Rebel" (Lunn, Rossington, J. Van Zant, White Johnson) – 6:47
 "Outta Hell in My Dodge" (Randall Hall, King, J. Van Zant, White Johnson) – 3:47
 "Kiss Your Freedom Goodbye" (King, J. Van Zant) – 4:46
 "South of Heaven" (Lunn, Rossington, J. Van Zant, White Johnson) – 5:15
 "Love Don't Always Come Easy" (King, J. Van Zant) – 4:34
 "Born to Run" (King, Rossington, Donnie Van Zant, J. Van Zant) – 7:25

Personnel 
Lynyrd Skynyrd
Gary Rossington – guitar
Ed King – guitar
Johnny Van Zant – lead vocals
Leon Wilkeson – bass
Billy Powell – piano, Hammond organ, synthesizer
Randall Hall – guitar
Kurt Custer – drums, percussion

Additional personnel
Dale Krantz Rossington – background vocals
Tim Lindsey – additional bass

Chart positions

References

1993 albums
Lynyrd Skynyrd albums
Albums produced by Barry Beckett
Atlantic Records albums